Buso may refer to:

Busójárás, a Hungarian festival
BüSo, short for Bürgerrechtsbewegung Solidarität, a German political party
Buso Renkin, Japanese magna series
Busō Shinki, alternative spelling of Busou Shinki, media mix franchise
Buso language, alternative name of Kwang language
Aurelio Buso, Italian painter
Paolo Buso, Italian Rugby player
Renato Buso, Italian football coach
Sergio Buso, Italian football coach
Uriel Buso, Israeli politician